Elliot Graham (born September 21, 1998) is a professional Canadian football defensive lineman for the Calgary Stampeders of the Canadian Football League (CFL).

University career
Graham played U Sports football for the UBC Thunderbirds from 2017 to 2019. He played in 23 regular season games where he had 87 tackles, one forced fumble, and one sack. He did not play in 2020 due to the cancellation of the 2020 U Sports football season but remained eligible for the 2021 CFL Draft.

Professional career
Graham was drafted in the fourth round, 29th overall, by the Calgary Stampeders in the 2021 CFL Draft and signed with the team on May 18, 2021. He made the team's active roster following training camp and made his professional debut on August 7, 2021, against the Toronto Argonauts. He played in the first seven regular season games in 2021 where he had three special teams tackles. He was transferred to the injured list in week 8 and sat out for the rest of the regular season, but returned to play in the team's West Semi-Final loss to the Saskatchewan Roughriders where he had one special teams tackle.

In 2022, Graham again made the team's opening day roster and played predominantly on special teams.

References

External links
 Calgary Stampeders bio

1998 births
Living people
Calgary Stampeders players
Canadian football defensive linemen
UBC Thunderbirds football players
Players of Canadian football from Ontario
Sportspeople from Hamilton, Ontario